Alexandru Papadopol (born 5 April 1975, in Râmnicu Vâlcea) is a Romanian actor.

At the beginning of the year 2000 he appeared in the films Marfa şi banii (Goods and Money or Stuff and Dough) and Occident, after which he appeared in a series of television productions.

Papadopol was married to Ioana Ginghina until they divorced in 2019. The couple have a daughter, Ruxi.

Selected filmography
Numai iubirea (2004) 
When Evening Falls on Bucharest or Metabolism (2013)
Two Lottery Tickets (2016)
 Toy Story That Time Forgot - Reptillus Maximus (Romanian dub)

References

External links

1975 births
Living people
People from Râmnicu Vâlcea
Romanian male film actors